Sabreena McKinnon (born Sabreena Duffy 26 March 2000) is an Australian rules footballer who played for Fremantle and Melbourne in the AFL Women's (AFLW). She was known as Sabreena Duffy during her playing career, but legally changed her family name to her foster parents name in December 2022.

McKinnon was drafted by Fremantle with their second selection and seventeenth overall in the 2018 AFL Women's draft. She made her debut in the four point win against Melbourne at Casey Fields in the opening round of the 2019 season.

After kicking two goals in her second game, McKinnon was rewarded with a nomination in the AFL Women's Rising Star award.

In 2020 McKinnon played in every game of Fremantle's undefeated season, kicking a team record 12 goals and was named in the 40-person AFL Women's All-Australian team squad.

McKinnon withdrew from the 2022 season due to wanting to focus on her career with the Department of Justice. At the end of the season, Fremantle delisted her. A few weeks later, she was signed by Melbourne as a free agent. She made only four appearances in the AFL Women's season seven due to a foot injury and was delisted by Melbourne in December 2022.

References

External links 

2000 births
Living people
Fremantle Football Club (AFLW) players
Australian rules footballers from Western Australia
Melbourne Football Club (AFLW) players